Schmeissneria is a genus of possible early angiosperms recorded from the Lower Jurassic of Europe and the Middle Jurassic of China, traditionally included in the Ginkgophyta.

References

Jurassic plants
Jurassic China
Prehistoric gymnosperm genera
Jurassic first appearances
Fossil taxa described in 1994